"Never Be the Same Again" is a song by British singer-songwriter Melanie C from the British girl group Spice Girls, featuring American rapper Lisa "Left Eye" Lopes of American girl group TLC. It was released on 20 March 2000 as the third single from her first solo album, Northern Star (1999). The song was co-written by Melanie C, producer Rhett Lawrence, Paul F. Cruz and Lopes.

"Never Be the Same Again" entered at the top of the UK Singles Chart, beating Moloko's "The Time Is Now" to the summit and it was Melanie C's first solo single to reach number one. It sold 144,936 copies in its first week and was Britain's eighteenth best-selling song of 2000. The song was successful in other markets, topping the charts in seven countries and receiving positive acclaim. By April 2021, the song had sold more than 477,000 copies in UK. The music video was directed by Francis Lawrence. It shows Melanie C waking up in a futuristic home and practicing tai chi with Lopes.

Composition
According to the sheet music published by Musicnotes.com by Hal Leonard Corporation, "Never Be the Same Again" is composed in the key of G minor and is written in the time signature of common time. It is set in a moderate tempo of 80 beats per minute, with Chisholm's voice spanning from G3 to E5. The song has a basic chord progression of Gm7–E9–B7–Dm.

Music video
The accompanying music video for "Never Be the Same Again" was filmed in January 2000 in Malibu, California, and shows Melanie C with short blonde hair as on the CD single cover wearing white clothes. It begins with a CD player (which says "Good day" in Icelandic, suggesting that the video is based in Iceland) and sound system starting up in a metal and glass room in a high building with glass bridges with smoke rising from below with a field background. She is also seen jogging on a treadmill with a changing foreground, lying in shallow water and on a bed in the dark with an orange-colored laser moving down her. Lisa "Left Eye" Lopes comes into the video to do her rap and both are seen doing tai-chi. Later, Melanie C is floating up in a high-ceiling room and the video ends with her looking at the outside view. The video includes shots of Iceland's famous Blue Lagoon. The entire idea for the video came from Melanie C herself: she wanted to make a calm video showing her taking care of her health.

Track listings

 UK CD1 and Australian CD single
 "Never Be the Same Again" 
 "I Wonder What It Would Be Like"
 "Never Be the Same Again" 
 "Never Be the Same Again" 

 UK CD2
 "Never Be the Same Again"
 "Closer" 
 "Goin' Down" 

 UK cassette single
 "Never Be the Same Again" 
 "I Wonder What It Would Be Like"
 "Never Be the Same Again" 

 European CD single
 "Never Be the Same Again" 
 "I Wonder What It Would Be Like"

Credits and personnel
Credits are taken from the Northern Star album booklet.

Studios
 Recorded at various studios in Los Angeles, London, and Glasgow
 Mixed at O'Henry's Sound Studio (Burbank, California)
 Mastered at Sterling Sound (New York City)

Personnel

 Melanie Chisholm – writing
 Rhett Lawrence – writing, production
 Paul F. Cruz – writing
 Lisa "Left Eye" Lopes – writing (as Lisa Lopes), lead rap
 Lorenzo Martin – writing
 Patrick McCarthy – mixing
 Ted Jensen – mastering

Charts

Weekly charts

Year-end charts

Decade-end charts

Certifications

References

1999 songs
2000 singles
Contemporary R&B ballads
Dutch Top 40 number-one singles
Lisa Lopes songs
Melanie C songs
Music videos directed by Francis Lawrence
Number-one singles in New Zealand
Number-one singles in Scotland
Number-one singles in Sweden
Song recordings produced by Rhett Lawrence
Songs written by Lisa Lopes
Songs written by Melanie C
Songs written by Rhett Lawrence
UK Singles Chart number-one singles